Gamelan degung is a form of Sundanese musical ensemble that uses a subset of modified gamelan instruments with a particular mode of degung scale. The instruments are manufactured under local conditions in towns in West Java such as Bogor and Bandung.  Degung music is often played at public gatherings in West Java, such as at local elections, as well as many other events. There is international interest in degung as well among communities in other countries interested in Indonesia and gamelan music.

Gamelan degung also playable in madenda scale, which included in the set as a complementary tone, usually marked as -3/ni tone in the set. Playing gamelan degung in this scale requires the substitution of the 3/na metal bars into -3/ni tone on all instruments.

Instruments 
The instrumentation of gamelan degung is quite flexible. It may include:

 Bonang/kolènang: two rows of seven small bulbous gongs. It differs from its Javanese counterpart in that the rows are each placed on either side of the player.
 saron/peking: a high-pitched bronze metallophone with fourteen keys. Usually there are two sarons in a single set.
 panerus: another bronze metallophone, similar to the peking but pitched an octave lower.
 Jengglong: six bulbous gongs suspended from the same frame. Could be layed like bonang, or hanged.
 goong ageung: a large gong.
 Pancer: a smaller gong, secondary gong.
 A set of kendang, consisting of one large (kendang indung) and two small double-sided drums (kulantér).
 Suling degung: a four-holed bamboo flute.
 Suling kawih: a six-holed bamboo flute, interchangebly used with suling degung
 Gambang: a wooden xylophone.
 Kacapi: a zither.

In classical degung, the bonang'' serves as a conductor for the whole ensemble. Except in certain modern compositions, it is rarely absent.

Gallery

See also

 Gong gede

References 

Gamelan ensembles and genres
Sundanese music